Windham Hospital is a private, nonprofit community care hospital in Willimantic, Connecticut. It first opened in 1933. The 130-bed hospital is part of the Hartford HealthCare system.

References

Hospitals in Connecticut
Willimantic, Connecticut